Recording the Universe is the name of a project by the band Depeche Mode to record some of the concerts on their 2009-10 concert tour, Tour of the Universe. The recordings were made by London-based company Live Here Now and are available via the band's website in digital download and double CD format.

Recording the Universe releases

Ramat Gan Stadium, Ramat Gan, Israel
Concert on 10 May 2009.

Track listing
{|-
|-
|width=250 valign=top|
Disc one
In Chains
Wrong
Hole to Feed
Walking in My Shoes
It's No Good
A Question of Time
Precious
Fly on the Windscreen
Jezebel
A Question of Lust
Come Back
Peace
|width=250 valign=top|
Disc two
In Your Room
I Feel You
In Sympathy
Enjoy the Silence
Never Let Me Down Again
Happy Birthday Dave
Stripped
Master and Servant
Strangelove
Personal Jesus
Waiting for the Night
|}

Zentralstadion, Leipzig, Germany
Concert on 8 June 2009.

Track listing
{|-
|-
|width=250 valign=top|
Disc one
In Chains
Wrong
Hole to Feed
Walking in My Shoes
It's No Good
A Question of Time
Precious
Fly on the Windscreen
Jezebel
A Question of Lust
Come Back
Peace
|width=250 valign=top|
Disc two
In Your Room
I Feel You
Policy of Truth
Enjoy the Silence
Never Let Me Down Again
Stripped
Master and Servant
Strangelove
Personal Jesus
Waiting for the Night
|}

Olympiastadion, Berlin, Germany
Concert on 10 June 2009.

Track listing
{|-
|-
|width=250 valign=top|
Disc one
In Chains
Wrong
Hole to Feed
Walking in My Shoes
It's No Good
A Question of Time
Precious
Fly on the Windscreen
Jezebel
A Question of Lust
Come Back
Peace
|width=250 valign=top|
Disc two
In Your Room
I Feel You
Policy of Truth
Enjoy the Silence
Never Let Me Down Again
Stripped
Master and Servant
Strangelove
Personal Jesus
Waiting for the Night
|}

Commerzbank-Arena, Frankfurt, Germany
Concert on 12 June 2009.

Track listing
{|-
|-
|width=250 valign=top|
Disc one
In Chains
Wrong
Hole to Feed
Walking in My Shoes
It's No Good
A Question of Time
Precious
Fly on the Windscreen
Jezebel
A Question of Lust
Come Back
Peace
|width=250 valign=top|
Disc two
In Your Room
I Feel You
Policy of Truth
Enjoy the Silence
Never Let Me Down Again
Stripped
Master and Servant
Strangelove
Personal Jesus
Waiting for the Night
|}

Olympiastadion, Munich, Germany
Concert on 13 June 2009.

Track listing
{|-
|-
|width=250 valign=top|
Disc one
In Chains
Wrong
Hole to Feed
Walking in My Shoes
It's No Good
A Question of Time
Precious
Fly on the Windscreen
Jezebel
Home
Come Back
Peace
|width=250 valign=top|
Disc two
In Your Room
I Feel You
Policy of Truth
Enjoy the Silence
Never Let Me Down Again
Stripped
Master and Servant
Strangelove
Personal Jesus
Waiting for the Night
|}

Stadio Olimpico, Rome, Italy
Concert on 16 June 2009.

Track listing
{|-
|-
|width=250 valign=top|
Disc one
In Chains
Wrong
Hole to Feed
Walking in My Shoes
It's No Good
A Question of Time
Precious
Fly on the Windscreen
Little Soul
Home
Come Back
Peace
|width=250 valign=top|
Disc two
In Your Room
I Feel You
Policy of Truth
Enjoy the Silence
Never Let Me Down Again
Stripped
Master and Servant
Strangelove
Personal Jesus
Waiting for the Night
|}

Stadio Giuseppe Meazza, Milan, Italy
Concert on 18 June 2009.

Track listing
{|-
|-
|width=250 valign=top|
Disc one
In Chains
Wrong
Hole to Feed
Walking in My Shoes
It's No Good
A Question of Time
Precious
Fly on the Windscreen
Little Soul
Home
Come Back
Peace
|width=250 valign=top|
Disc two
In Your Room
I Feel You
Policy of Truth
Enjoy the Silence
Never Let Me Down Again
Stripped
Master and Servant
Strangelove
Personal Jesus
Waiting for the Night
|}

TW Classic Festival, Werchter, Belgium
Concert on 20 June 2009.

Track listing
{|
|-
|width=250 valign=top|
Disc one
In Chains
Wrong
Hole to Feed
Walking in My Shoes
It's No Good
A Question of Time
Precious
Fly on the Windscreen
Little Soul
Home
Come Back
Peace
|width=250 valign=top|
Disc two
In Your Room
I Feel You
Policy of Truth
Enjoy the Silence
Never Let Me Down Again
Stripped
Master and Servant
Strangelove
Personal Jesus
Waiting for the Night
|}

Inter Stadium, Bratislava, Slovakia
Concert on 22 June 2009.

Track listing
{|
|-
|width=250 valign=top|
Disc one
In Chains
Wrong
Hole to Feed
Walking in My Shoes
It's No Good
A Question of Time
Precious
Fly on the Windscreen
Little Soul
Home
Come Back
Peace
|width=250 valign=top|
Disc two
In Your Room
I Feel You
Policy of Truth
Enjoy the Silence
Never Let Me Down Again
Stripped
Master and Servant
Strangelove
Personal Jesus
Waiting for the Night
|}

Stadion Puskás Ferenc, Budapest, Hungary
Concert on 23 June 2009.

Track listing
{|
|-
|width=250 valign=top|
Disc one
In Chains
Wrong
Hole to Feed
Walking in My Shoes
It's No Good
A Question of Time
Precious
Fly on the Windscreen
Jezebel
A Question of Lust
Come Back
Peace
|width=250 valign=top|
Disc two
In Your Room
I Feel You
Policy of Truth
Enjoy the Silence
Never Let Me Down Again
Stripped
Master and Servant
Strangelove
Personal Jesus
Waiting for the Night
|}

Slavia Stadium, Prague, Czech Republic
Concert on 25 June 2009.

Track listing
{|
|-
|width=250 valign=top|
Disc one
In Chains
Wrong
Hole to Feed
Walking in My Shoes
It's No Good
A Question of Time
Precious
Fly on the Windscreen
Little Soul
Home
Come Back
Peace
|width=250 valign=top|
Disc two
In Your Room
I Feel You
Policy of Truth
Enjoy the Silence
Never Let Me Down Again
Stripped
Master and Servant
Strangelove
Personal Jesus
Waiting for the Night
|}

Stade de France, Paris, France
Concert on 27 June 2009.

Track listing

Zénith Amphitheatre, Nancy, France
Concert on 28 June 2009.

Track listing

Parken Stadium, Copenhagen, Denmark
Concert on 30 June 2009.

Track listing

HSH Nordbank Arena, Hamburg, Germany
Concert on 1 July 2009.

Track listing

Arvika Festival, Arvika, Sweden
Concert on 3 July 2009.

Track listing

Esplanade Gambetta, Carcassonne, France
Concert on 6 July 2009.

Track listing

Estadio José Zorrilla, Valladolid, Spain
Concert on 8 July 2009.

Track listing

Bilbao Live Festival, Bilbao, Spain
Concert on 9 July 2009.

Track listing

Molson Amphitheater, Toronto, Canada
Concert on 24 July 2009.

Track listing

Bell Centre, Montreal, Canada
Concert on 25 July 2009.

Track listing

Nissan Pavilion, Washington D. C., United States
Concert on 28 July 2009.

Track listing

Comcast Center, Boston, United States
Concert on 31 July 2009.

Track listing

The Borgata, Atlantic City, United States
Concert on 1 August 2009.

Track listing

KeyArena, Seattle, United States
Concert on 10 August 2009.

Track listing

Honda Center, Anaheim, United States
Concert on 19 August 2009.

Track listing

Pearl Concert Theater, Paradise, Nevada, United States
Concert on 22 August 2009.

Track listing

US Airways Center, Phoenix, United States
Concert on 23 August 2009.

Track listing

E Center, Salt Lake City, United States
Concert on 25 August 2009.

Track listing

Red Rocks, Denver, United States
Concert on 27 August 2009.

Track listing

Superpages.com Center, Dallas, United States
Concert on 29 August 2009.

Track listing

Woodlands Pavilion, Houston, United States
Concert on 30 August 2009.

Track listing

Lakewood Amphitheater, Atlanta, United States
Concert on 1 September 2009.

Track listing

Ford Amphitheater, Tampa, United States
Concert on 4 September 2009.

Track listing

BankAtlantic Center, Ft. Lauderdale, United States
Concert on 5 September 2009.

Track listing

Arena VFG, Guadalajara, Mexico
Concert on 1 October 2009.

Track listing

Foro Sol, Mexico City, Mexico
Concert on 3 October 2009.

Track listing

Foro Sol, Mexico City, Mexico
Concert on 4 October 2009.

Track listing

Monterrey Arena, Monterrey, Mexico
Concert on 6 October 2009.

Track listing

SECC, Glasgow, Scotland
Concert on 12 December 2009.

Track listing

LG Arena, Birmingham, England
Concert on 13 December 2009.

Track listing

O2 Arena, London, England
Concert on 15 December 2009.

Track listing

O2 Arena, London, England
Concert on 16 December 2009.

Track listing

MEN, Manchester, England
Concert on 18 December 2009.

Track listing

Royal Albert Hall (Concert for Teenage Cancer Trust), London, England
Concert on 17 February 2010

Track listing

O2 Arena, London, England
Concert on 20 February 2010.

Track listing

LTU arena, Düsseldorf, Germany
Concert on 26 February 2010.

Track listing
{|-
|-
|width=250 valign=top|
Disc one
In Chains
Wrong
Hole to Feed
Walking in My Shoes
It's No Good
A Question of Time
Precious
World in My Eyes
Insight
Home
|width=250 valign=top|Disc two'''
Miles Away/The Truth is
Policy of Truth
In Your Room
I Feel You
Enjoy the Silence
Never Let Me Down Again
Dressed in Black
Stripped
Behind the Wheel
Personal Jesus
|}

LTU arena, Düsseldorf, Germany
Concert on 27 February 2010.

Track listing
{|-
|-
|width=250 valign=top|
Disc one
In Chains
Wrong
Hole to Feed
Walking in My Shoes
It's No Good
A Question of Time
Precious
World in My Eyes
One Caress
Home
|width=250 valign=top|
Disc two
Miles Away/The Truth is
Policy of Truth
In Your Room
I Feel You
Enjoy the Silence
Never Let Me Down Again
Somebody
Stripped
Photographic
Personal Jesus
|}

References

Live album series
Depeche Mode live albums
2009 live albums
2010 live albums
Albums recorded at Red Rocks Amphitheatre